Richard Collins may refer to:

Richard Collins (actor) (1947–2013), actor of the television show Trailer Park Boys
Richard Collins (artist) (1755–1831), British miniature portrait painter
Richard Collins (bishop) (1857–1924), Roman Catholic bishop of Hexham and Newcastle
Richard Collins (historian), Kentucky historian and a founder of The Filson Historical Society
Richard A. Collins (born 1966), British scientist and author
Richard G. Collins (born 1949), member of the Delaware House of Representatives
Richard J. Collins (1914–2013), American screenwriter and producer
Richard L. Collins (1933–2018), aviation writer
Richard Collins, Baron Collins (1842–1911), British law lord

See also
Richard Collin (1626–1698), engraver from Luxemburg
Richard H. Collin (1932–2010), history professor and New Orleans food writer
Richie Collins (born 1962), Welsh rugby player